The 1902–03 Sheffield Shield season was the 11th season of the Sheffield Shield, the domestic first-class cricket competition of Australia. New South Wales won the championship.

Table

Statistics

Most Runs
Reggie Duff 583

Most Wickets
Bill Howell 26

References

Sheffield Shield
Sheffield Shield
Sheffield Shield seasons